Amy Hall is an English actress.

Career
Hall took a BA in English Literature at the University of Wales, Swansea before training and studying for an MA in Performance at the Drama Centre, London, where she appeared in productions of Macbeth and The Seagull, graduating in 2006,

Theatre
Hall's work in theatre includes: Present Laughter and The Hour We Knew Nothing of Each Other at the National Theatre, London and We That Are Left at the Palace Theatre, Watford.

Film
In film, she has appeared in Lift and the short films Pride and What?, Illegal and Kate 1, 2, 3.

Television
She has appeared in Wire in the Blood, and EastEnders.

References

External links 
 

Living people
English stage actresses
English film actresses
Year of birth missing (living people)